Julien Dumora (born 23 March 1988 in Arudy, France) is a French professional rugby union player. He currently plays at full back for Castres in the Top 14.

In the final of the 2017–18 Top 14 season he scored a try as Castres defeated Montpellier.

Honours

Club 
 Castres
Top 14: 2017–18

References

External links
 Ligue Nationale De Rugby Profile
 European Professional Club Rugby Profile

Living people
1988 births
French rugby union players
Rugby union fullbacks
People from Béarn
Sportspeople from Pyrénées-Atlantiques
Castres Olympique players
Section Paloise players
RC Toulonnais players
Lyon OU players